The New York State Department of Environmental Conservation Police (NYSDEC Police), is the law enforcement agency of the New York State Department of Environmental Conservation, Division of Law Enforcement. NYS Environmental Conservation Officers are New York State police officers. As the uniformed law enforcement representatives of the Department of Environmental Conservation, environmental conservation police are responsible for the enforcement of the environmental laws and regulations of New York and for the detection and investigation of suspected violations.

Overview
Environmental Conservation Officers focus their efforts on Environmental Conservation Law (ECL) enforcement although they are empowered to enforce all laws of the state. Their mission includes two areas: fish & wildlife, and environmental quality. Enforcing fish & wildlife laws include investigating complaints of poaching, the illegal sale of wildlife, and checking hunters, fishermen, trappers, and commercial fishermen (lobsters, clams, bait fish, food fish) for compliance. Enforcing environmental quality laws often includes investigating timber thefts, water pollution, improper use or application of pesticides, commercial vehicles producing excessive emissions, wetland degradation, illegal mining, and almost any area that affects air, land, or water quality violations.

Uniforms and equipment
Environmental Conservation Officers (ECOs) have three main uniforms. The full dress uniform consists of a green dress coat and green trousers with black piping. A green straw campaign cover is worn with this uniform. The slightly less formal dress uniform, sometimes worn on patrol, consists of a green uniform shirt and green dress pants, worn with a leather duty belt and the same green campaign hat. The rough duty uniform, usually worn for patrol purposes, consists of green cargo pants, a fatigue-style green uniform shirt, and a baseball cap or watch cap. A nylon duty belt is worn with this uniform, and bulletproof vests are often worn.

Training
All ECO Trainee 1's must complete a 26-week residential basic training academy, currently held in Pulaski, NY, which emphasizes police skills as well as the technical aspects of environmental law enforcement. Trainees then must perform enforcement work under close and continuous supervision of a Field Training Officer. The ECO Trainee 1, after successfully completing there first year, will advance to ECO Trainee 2.

Upon Completion of a 2nd year in the training program, the Trainee 2 will advance to ECO.

Fallen officers
Since the establishment of the New York State Game Protectors, ten officers have died while on duty.

See also

New York State Forest Rangers
List of law enforcement agencies in New York
Game warden
NYC DEP Police
New York City Environmental Police Unit / Permit and Inspection Unit (NYC Sanitation)
United States Park Police
National Park Service Law Enforcement Rangers

References

External links
New York State DEC Division of Law Enforcement
New York Conservation Officers Association

1880 establishments in New York (state)
State law enforcement agencies of New York (state)
DEC police